Gruffydd ap Rhys II (died 25 July 1201) was a prince of Deheubarth in south-west Wales.

Lineage 

He was the son of Rhys ap Gruffydd (The Lord Rhys) and grandson of Gruffydd ap Rhys. Gruffydd was the eldest son of Rhys ap Gruffydd by his wife Gwenllian, daughter of Madog ap Maredudd prince of Powys. Rhys intended Gruffydd to be his main heir, and in 1189 he married Maud de Braose, the daughter of Maud de St Valery and of William de Braose. They had two sons, Rhys and Owain.

Family feud 
In Rhys' last years a feud developed between Gruffydd and his brother Maelgwn ap Rhys, both supported by some of their other brothers. In 1189 Rhys was persuaded to imprison Maelgwn, and he was given into Gruffydd's keeping at Dinefwr. Gruffydd handed him over to his father in law, William de Braose. In 1192 Rhys secured Maelgwn's release, but by now he and Gruffydd were bitter enemies. In 1194 Maelgwn and another brother Hywel defeated their father and imprisoned him, though he was later released by Hywel.

Rhys ap Gruffydd died in 1197. Gruffydd was recognised as his successor after an interview with Archbishop Hubert the justiciar. But Maelgwn used troops supplied by Gwenwynwyn ab Owain of Powys to attack Aberystwyth. He captured the town and the castle, and took Gruffydd himself prisoner, later handing him over to Gwenwynwyn who in turn transferred him to the English who imprisoned him in Corfe Castle.

In 1198 Gwenwynwyn threatened the English holdings at Painscastle and Elfael, and Gruffydd was released from captivity to try to mediate in the dispute. His efforts failed, and in the ensuing battle Gwenwynwyn was defeated.

Gruffydd retained his liberty and by the end of the year had captured all of Ceredigion from Maelgwn except for the castles of Cardigan and Ystrad Meurig. In 1199 he took Cilgerran Castle. Maelgwn made an agreement with King John of England, selling Cardigan castle to him in exchange for the possession of the remainder of Ceredigion.

In July 1201 another brother, Maredudd ap Rhys, was killed, and Gruffydd took over his lands.

Death and burial 
On 25 July 1201 Gruffydd himself died of an illness and was buried in Strata Florida Abbey.

References
John Edward Lloyd (1911) A history of Wales from the earliest times to the Edwardian conquest (Longmans, Green & Co.)

1201 deaths
Monarchs of Deheubarth
12th-century Welsh monarchs
Year of birth unknown